Slivo Pole Municipality is a municipality (obshtina) in Ruse Province, Northeastern Bulgaria, located along the right bank of Danube river in the Danubian Plain. It is named after its administrative centre - the town of Slivo Pole.

The municipality embraces a territory of 276 km2 with a population of 11,635 inhabitants, as of December 2009.

The main road II-21 crosses the area from west to east, connecting the province centre of Ruse with the city of Silistra.

Settlements 

Slivo Pole Municipality includes the following 11 places (towns are shown in bold):

Demography 
The following table shows the change of the population during the last four decades.

Religion 
According to the latest Bulgarian census of 2011, the religious composition, among those who answered the optional question on religious identification, was the following:

See also
Provinces of Bulgaria
Municipalities of Bulgaria
List of cities and towns in Bulgaria

References

External links
 Official website 

Municipalities in Ruse Province